The Romance of Elaine is a 1915 American silent adventure film serial directed by George B. Seitz, Leopold Wharton and Theodore Wharton, based on the novel by Arthur B. Reeve. The film is considered to be lost.

Cast
 Pearl White as Elaine Dodge
 Creighton Hale as Walter Jameson
 Lionel Barrymore as Marcus Del Mar / Mr. X
 Arnold Daly as Detective Craig Kennedy
 Warner Oland
 Bessie Wharton as Aunt Josephine
 George B. Seitz
 Howard Cody (uncredited)
 Paul Everton (uncredited)
 Robin H. Townley (uncredited)
 Louis Wolheim (uncredited)

Chapter titles
 The Lost Torpedo
 The Gray Friar
 The Vanishing Man
 The Submarine Harbor
 The Conspirators
 The Wireless Detective
 The Death Cloud
 The Search Light Gun
 The Life Chain
 The Flash
 The Disappearing Helmets
 The Triumph of Elaine

See also
List of lost films

References

External links
 

1915 films
1915 lost films
1915 adventure films
American adventure films
American silent serial films
American black-and-white films
Films directed by George B. Seitz
Films directed by Leopold Wharton
Films directed by Theodore Wharton
Lost American films
Lost adventure films
Pathé Exchange film serials
1910s American films
Silent adventure films